"Diva" is a song recorded by South Korean girl group After School. The song was released on April 9, 2009, as a digital single and later added on the group's second single album "Because of You" as a B-side. The song is the first release including Uee and the last release including Soyoung, who withdrew from the group to become an actress.

A Japanese version of the song was released on November 23, 2011, serving as the group's second Japanese single. An original Japanese song "Ready to Love" was released with the single.

Track listing

Trivia
"Tap Slap" is a Japanese instrumental version of the song "Let's Step Up", included on the group's first album Virgin. The Korean version of "Diva" included on the Japanese single is a new version. It used the Japanese instrumental for the version and included the members Nana, Lizzy, Raina and E-Young.

Chart performance

Korean version

Japanese version

Release history

References

External links
 Official website

2009 singles
Korean-language songs
2011 singles
Japanese-language songs
After School (band) songs
2009 songs
Avex Trax singles
Hybe Corporation singles